Bernd Stumpf (born 16 June 1940 in Jena) is a German football referee who served as a match official in the first division DDR-Oberliga of the former East Germany. He also worked as a FIFA referee and adjudicated 6 European Cup matches.

Stumpf was infamous for his role as the referee who by accusation manipulated the outcome of 22 March 1986 championship match between BFC Dynamo and 1. FC Lokomotive Leipzig which ended in a 1–1 draw that helped BFC Dynamo winning its eighth consecutive national title. Down to ten men after an unduly harsh red card, 1. FC Lokomotive Leipzig held a 1–0 lead as the game was extended into its 94th minute without cause, until BFC Dynamo finally tied the match on a questionable penalty. BFC Dynamo was under patronage of the Stasi,  the state secret police of East Germany headed by Erich Mielke, at the time. 

The alleged blatant nature of the manipulation of the decisive match led to nationwide protests. Stumpf was made an example of. The DFV (East German Football Federation) responded by placing a lifetime ban on Stumpf. However, there was no admission of complicity by Stumpf, the Stasi, or the football club, and there was no sanction against BFC Dynamo – their title stood regardless of the protest.

It was eventually learned that Stumpf had worked for the Stasi under the cover name "Peter Richter" since the end of his army service. However, the is no evidence to show that referees in East Germany were under direct instructions from the Stasi to favor BFC Dynamo.

After German reunification in 1990 he trained game officials for the Thüringer Fußballverband (Thuringian Football Association) and became part of the safety committee of the Nordostdeutschen Fußballverbandes (North East German Football Association).

Bernd Stumpf has continuously denied any role in manipulating matches during the East German era. Through a video recording which was published by Mitteldeutscher Rundfunk (MDR) in 2000 it was shown that the infamous penalty against 1. FC Lokomotive Leipzig in the match against BFC Dynamo on 22 March 1986 was correctly awarded and that the sanctions against him was unjustified. The video recording had been filmed for training purposes and showed the situation from a different angle. In the video recording, it was possible to see how Hans Richter of 1. FC Lokomotive Leipzig pushed Bernd Schulz of BFC Dynamo with both hands in the penalty area.

References

External links
 
 

1940 births
Living people
Sportspeople from Jena
German football referees
People of the Stasi